Branislav Jovanović (born 21 September 1985) is a Serbian professional footballer who plays as a defensive midfielder for Novi Sad 1921.

Club career
Jovanović made his senior debuts with Jedinstvo Surčin. He also played for Beograd in the Serbian League Belgrade, before moving to Cypriot club Ethnikos Achna. In the 2009 winter transfer window, Jovanović returned to his homeland and signed with Serbian SuperLiga side Napredak Kruševac.

In June 2009, Jovanović signed a four-year contract with Partizan. He helped the side defend the league title in the 2009–10 season. After an unsuccessful negotiation with Turkish side Galatasaray, Jovanović signed for Serbian SuperLiga club Rad on the last day of the 2010 summer transfer window.

In the 2013 winter transfer window, Jovanović moved abroad for the second time and joined Israeli side Hapoel Acre. He spent three and a half years at the club, collecting over 100 appearances across all domestic competitions (Premier League, State Cup and Toto Cup).

In August 2016, Jovanović returned to Serbia and signed with Voždovac. He moved back to Israel just six months later and joined Hapoel Ashkelon. After playing for Hapoel Ramat Gan, Jovanović rejoined his former club Rad in early 2019.

International career
On 7 June 2011, Jovanović made his international debut for Serbia, coming on as a substitute for Dejan Stanković in a 0–0 friendly draw against Australia.

Honours
Partizan
 Serbian SuperLiga: 2009–10

References

External links
 
 
 

Association football midfielders
Cypriot First Division players
Ethnikos Achna FC players
Expatriate footballers in Cyprus
Expatriate footballers in Israel
FK Beograd players
FK Jedinstvo Surčin players
FK Napredak Kruševac players
FK Partizan players
FK Rad players
FK Voždovac players
Footballers from Belgrade
Hapoel Acre F.C. players
Hapoel Ashkelon F.C. players
Hapoel Ramat Gan F.C. players
FK Proleter Novi Sad players
Israeli Premier League players
Serbia and Montenegro footballers
Serbia international footballers
Serbian expatriate footballers
Serbian expatriate sportspeople in Cyprus
Serbian expatriate sportspeople in Israel
Serbian footballers
Serbian SuperLiga players
1985 births
Living people